HMSAS Protea was the first hydrographic survey ship used by the South African Naval Service (which later became the South African Navy).  The ship was laid down as a minesweeper to be named HMS Ventnor in 1917 but was renamed HMS Verwood in 1918 before she was launched.  She was again re-named and launched as HMS Crozier on 1 July 1919. The vessel was converted from a minesweeper to a hydropraphic survey vessel in 1921 and transferred to the South African forces in 1922, where she was commissioned as HMSAS Protea. She served as a survey vessel until 1933 when she was returned to the Royal Navy.  Protea was eventually sold by the Royal Navy and renamed MV Queen of the Bay where she went on to operate as a pleasure craft out of Blackpool.  She was subsequntly sold to the Spanish Navy and renamed Lieutenant Captain Remigio Verdia, and used as supply vessel to run blockades, smuggling supplies to the anti-fascists in Spain during the civil war.  She ran aground and sunk off Cartagena in Spain in 1939.

Royal Navy history
Whilst named HMS Crozier (and commanded by Cdr D.E. St M. Delius OBE) the ship was re-assigned from the Royal Navy to the South African Naval Service and was to sail to South Africa, together with two minesweeper trawlers (HMS Eden and HMS Foyle).  They ships became the first vessels of what was later to become the South African Navy.  and these three ships were to be transferred to South Africa under the terms of an Imperial Conference held in London in 1921.  Under these clauses, South Africa would assume responsibility for hydrographic survey of its own waters, create a permanent sea-going navy, and expand the dockyard in Simonstown. To assist the South Africans, the British Givernment agreed to donate a survey ship and two minesweepers to South Africa, with Crozier, Eden and Foyle being the nominated ships. They sailed from Devonport, Plymouth on 15 December 1921

The three ship convoy reached Madeira on 23 December 1921 and stopped in Sierra Leone to take on coal, drinking water and provisions.  They next called at Lagos and Luanda and then Walvis Bay in South West Africa after a 14 day voyage and reached Simon's Bay on 11 January 1922, after a voyage of 50 days.  There was no official welcome for the first ships of the new navy, but there was a report in the Cape Times that read "His Majesty's Surveying Vessel Crozier, which with the trawlers Eden and Foyle, have been acquired by the Union Government to form the nucleus of the South African Navy, arrived here last night from England, calling en route at Gibraltar, Las Palmas, Sierra Leone, Lagos, St Paul de Loanda and Walfisch Bay. SM."

South African Naval Service history
Although being commissioned on 1 April 1922, she retained the name Crozier for a year after arriving in South Africa and was renamed HMSAS Protea on 2 December 1922.

Image of HMSAS Protea after being refitted as a pleasure craft and renamed SS Queen of the Bay circa. 1935.

Notes and references

Notes

Citations

Bibliography

Hunt-class minesweepers (1916)
Ships of the South African Navy
1919 ships
Ships built in Scotland